France Gall is a studio album by French singer France Gall.

It was her first album produced by Michel Berger.

Released on 6 January 1976, this album was certified Gold for over 100,000 copies sold in France.

Track listing

References

France Gall albums
Philips Records albums
1976 albums
Albums produced by Michel Berger